John Badley may refer to:

John Badley (surgeon) (1783–1870), English surgeon, fellow of the Royal College of Surgeons and medical pioneer
John Haden Badley (1865–1967), English educator, founder and headmaster of Bedales School